Hemphillia is a genus of air-breathing land slugs, terrestrial pulmonate gastropod mollusks in the family Arionidae, the roundback slugs.

The generic name Hemphillia is in honor of an American malacologist Henry Hemphill (1830–1914).

At least some species of this genus are known as jumping slugs due to their behavior when threatened. At such times, they "jump" by coiling up and straightening out repeatedly in rapid succession.

Species 
Species in the genus Hemphillia include: 
 Hemphillia burringtoni
 Hemphillia camelus
 Hemphillia danielsi
 Hemphillia dromedarius
 Hemphillia glandulosa - the type species
 Hemphillia malonei
 Hemphillia pantherina
 Hemphillia skadei

References

Arionidae